George Nemeth (April 10, 1933 – October 2, 2009) was a Hungarian Canadian psychologist, avant-garde trend poet, and writer.

Biography 
Nemeth was born in 1933, and grew up under Mátyás Rákosi's socialist regime. After the Hungarian Revolution of 1956, Nemeth fled Hungary, and settled in Canada. In 1957, Nemeth got his PhD in psychology from McGill University and taught psychology at Concordia University. 

Nemeth began his poetic career in the 1960s. In 1981, he co-founded the Arkánum Magazine, which he also co-edited with Sándor András, Jószef Bakucz, and László Kemenes Géfin. He died in 2009 in Montreal.

References

1933 births
2009 deaths
Canadian psychologists
Academic staff of Concordia University
Hungarian emigrants to Canada
McGill University Faculty of Science alumni
Writers from Budapest
20th-century psychologists